In Greek mythology, Pandareus was the son of Merops and a nymph. His residence was given as either Ephesus or Miletus.

Mythology

Crete 
Pandareus was said to have been favored by Demeter, who conferred upon him the benefit of never suffering from indigestion, however much food he should eat. At the request of his impious friend, Tantalus, Pandareus stole a golden dog from a temple to Zeus on Crete (the dog had guarded Zeus during his infancy by the will of Rhea). According to various sources, he was either turned to stone or fled to Sicily, where he perished together with his wife Harmothoë. A Byzantine scholar, Eustathius of Thessalonica, writes that Pandareus and Tantalus attempted to steal a mechanic dog, crafted by Hephaestus himself, that was placed in a temple of Zeus in Crete. Zeus sent his son Hermes to steal the dog back and then punished the two thieves.

Anatolia 
Pandareus was the father of Aedon (wife of Zethus), Chelidon, Cleodora (or Cleothera) and Merope; according to Pausanias, the last two were called Cameiro and Clytia. After the death of their parents, Aphrodite took care of Cleodora and Merope, Hera taught them to be proper women, and Athena made them accomplished; but when Aphrodite went to see Zeus to get them married, storm winds carried them away to become handmaidens of the furies. In another myth, Aëdon's husband Polytechnus came to him under the excuse that Aëdon wanted her sister Chelidon to visit her, when in fact he owed his wife a female slave. Pandareus, not suspecting a thing, let Polytechnus take Chelidon, but he proceeded to rape her and force her to serve as a slave for Aëdon. The two sisters soon escaped and ran back to Pandareus, who had Polytechnus tied, smeared with honey and left to the mercy of flies. Aëdon in pity kept the flies off of Polytechnus, angering Pandareus, his wife and his son. They were about to attack Aëdon, but Zeus interfered, and transformed them all into birds. Pandareus was changed into a sea eagle, his wife into a kingfisher, his son into a hoopoe.

Notes

References 
 Antoninus Liberalis, The Metamorphoses of Antoninus Liberalis translated by Francis Celoria (Routledge 1992). Online version at the Topos Text Project.
 Homer, The Odyssey with an English Translation by A.T. Murray, PH.D. in two volumes. Cambridge, MA., Harvard University Press; London, William Heinemann, Ltd. 1919. . Online version at the Perseus Digital Library. Greek text available from the same website.
 Homer. The Odyssey, Book XIX, in The Iliad & The Odyssey. Trans. Samuel Butler. pp. 676–7. 
 Pausanias, Description of Greece with an English Translation by W.H.S. Jones, Litt.D., and H.A. Ormerod, M.A., in 4 Volumes. Cambridge, MA, Harvard University Press; London, William Heinemann Ltd. 1918. . Online version at the Perseus Digital Library
 Pausanias, Graeciae Descriptio. 3 vols. Leipzig, Teubner. 1903.  Greek text available at the Perseus Digital Library.
 William Smith, Dictionary of Greek and Roman Biography and Mythology, v. 3, page 109

Anatolian characters in Greek mythology
Cretan mythology
Deeds of Zeus
Metamorphoses into inanimate objects in Greek mythology
Metamorphoses into birds in Greek mythology
Deeds of Hermes
Deeds of Demeter